Liang En-shuo (born 2 October 2000) is a tennis player from Taiwan.

She has a career-high singles ranking of world No. 150, achieved on 13 May 2019. On 20 February 2023, she peaked at No. 165 in the doubles rankings. Liang has won one WTA 125 doubles title, as well as one singles title and three doubles titles in ITF Circuit tournaments.

Junior career
Liang had a career-high ITF junior combined ranking of No. 2, achieved on 29 January 2018.

In January 2018, she won the Australian Open girls' singles title, defeating Clara Burel in the final, in straight sets.

Professional career
She made her Grand Slam debut as a qualifier at the 2021 French Open.

Performance timeline

Singles
Current after the 2022 Thailand Open.

WTA 125 tournament finals

Doubles: 1 (title)

ITF Circuit finals

Singles: 4 (1 title, 3 runner-ups)

Doubles: 12 (6 titles, 6 runners-up)

Junior Grand Slam finals

Singles: 1 title

Doubles: 1 title

Notes

References

External links
 
 

2000 births
Living people
Taiwanese female tennis players
Australian Open (tennis) junior champions
Tennis players at the 2018 Asian Games
Medalists at the 2018 Asian Games
Asian Games medalists in tennis
Asian Games bronze medalists for Chinese Taipei
Tennis players at the 2018 Summer Youth Olympics
Sportspeople from Kaohsiung
Grand Slam (tennis) champions in girls' singles
Grand Slam (tennis) champions in girls' doubles
21st-century Taiwanese women